Cristina Adriana Chiara Scabbia (born 6 June 1972) is an Italian singer, best known as one of the two vocalists of gothic metal band Lacuna Coil. 

Scabbia used to write an advice column in the popular rock magazine Revolver, alongside musician Vinnie Paul. Scabbia is featured in a Megadeth song "À Tout le Monde (Set Me Free)". She also featured on "The Theory of Everything", an album from Arjen Anthony Lucassen's Ayreon project, with which she is cast as the Mother. She is also the featured artist in the Apocalyptica song "S.O.S. (Anything But Love)" and another version of the Alter Bridge song "Watch Over You". Scabbia performed a duet with the Italian ex-singer of Linea 77 Emiliano Audisio on the track "Beautiful Lie" to be part of the soundtrack for the 2013 Italian film Passione sinistra.

Lacuna Coil 

In 1991, Scabbia began singing professionally as a touring musician for other bands and providing backing vocals. Later that year, she met the male vocalist Andrea Ferro and bass player Marco Coti Zelati of Lacuna Coil in Milan's Midnight club and started dating Marco after. At the time, the band was named Ethereal, and Scabbia was asked to do vocals by Marco. She recorded vocals on the demo tapes, and was then invited to be a permanent member.

After several changes in the band's line-up, the members were reduced to Ferro, Coti Zelati and Scabbia. The members recorded a two track demo in May 1996, and were soon signed by the German branch of Century Media, eventually joining with the American branch of the label. Once signed, the band changed their name to Lacuna Coil after learning that a Greek band signed to Century Media had already claimed the name Ethereal. Adding new band members, Lacuna Coil released their first album in 1999.

Guest work

References

External links 

 
 

1972 births
20th-century Italian women singers
21st-century Italian women singers
Alternative metal musicians
Living people
Singers from Milan
Italian contraltos
Italian women singer-songwriters
Italian singer-songwriters
Women heavy metal singers
Italian heavy metal musicians
Lacuna Coil members
English-language singers from Italy
Century Media Records artists
Women in metal